Moyola Park is a country estate near Castledawson, County Londonderry, Northern Ireland. It is currently the home of Lady Moyola, widow of Lord Moyola, former Prime Minister of Northern Ireland. Moyola house was built in 1713 by Joshua Dawson, Chief-Secretary under Queen Anne, who built the Mansion House on Dawson Street, Dublin in 1710. The Mansion House was sold to the Dublin Corporation in 1715, for £3,500, and it has since become the official residence of the Lord Mayor of Dublin.   

The Chichester-Clark family are descended from the Dawsons due to the marriage of Mary Dawson and Lord Adolphus Spencer-Churchill Chichester.

References

Buildings and structures in County Londonderry
Register of Parks, Gardens and Demesnes of Special Historic Interest
1713 establishments in the British Empire